John Brunero is an American philosopher and Robert R. Chambers Distinguished Professor of Philosophy at the University of Nebraska–Lincoln.
He is known for his works on reasons.

Books
Instrumental Rationality: The Normativity of Means-Ends Coherence (Oxford University Press, 2020)

References

 

21st-century American philosophers
Philosophy academics
Living people
Year of birth missing (living people)
Place of birth missing (living people)
Columbia University alumni
University of Nebraska–Lincoln faculty